Sainik School Kapurthala is one of 33 Sainik Schools across India. The school was inaugurated in July 1961 by the then Defence Minister V.K.Krishna Menon, with the objective of preparing boys and girls for entry into National Defence Academy in Khadakwasla. Its motto is "Knowledge, Humility and Discipline". It is a fully residential school for boys only, providing public school education. It has produced more than 1150 officers for the Indian armed forces through National Defence Academy. It is the only school among the 33 Sainik Schools which has held the Defence Minister's trophy continuously for nine years.

 The school was the palace of Maharaja Jagjit singh.

See also
 Indian Naval Academy
 Indian Military Academy

References

Schools in Punjab, India
Sainik schools
Kapurthala
Military high schools
Boys' schools in India
Palaces in Punjab, India
Educational institutions established in 1961
1961 establishments in East Punjab